Löb ben Moses Minden (died 26 May 1751), also known as Judah ben Moses Selichower, was a ḥazzan and poet.

Biography
Minden was born in Selichow, Lesser Poland, in the seventeenth century. He acted as ḥazzan at Minden-on-the-Weser, whence his name "Minden." He was the author of Shire Yehudah, Hebrew songs with German translations and music. One of these begins: "Ihr lieben Brüder und Gesellen, die da sitzen und zechen," and another, "Hört zu, ihr Leut, gedenkt an die Zeit." In an epilogue to this work (Amsterdam, 1696) he exhorts the rabbis not to allow conversation in the synagogue. He wrote also Zemer va-Shir (Frankfurt-on-the-Main, 1714), which was printed by Solomon London.

He died at an advanced age in Altona or Hamburg in 1751.

Publications

References
 

1751 deaths
18th-century male singers
18th-century Polish Jews
18th-century Polish–Lithuanian poets
18th-century Polish–Lithuanian singers
Hazzans
Hebrew-language poets
Jewish poets
People from Minden
People from Garwolin County